Nosotros is a 1945 Mexican romantic drama film directed by Fernando A. Rivero. It stars Ricardo Montalban, Emilia Guiú, and Esther Luquín.

References

External links
 

1945 films
1945 romantic drama films
Mexican black-and-white films
Mexican romantic drama films
1940s Mexican films